Frederick Stoddard "Rick" Chaffee II (born January 10, 1945) is a former World Cup alpine ski racer from the United States. He competed in the Winter Olympics in 1968 and 1972. Chaffee finished ninth in the slalom in 1968 to join teammates Spider Sabich and Jimmie Heuga in the top ten.

Born in Rutland, Vermont, Chaffee raced for the University of Denver and won individual and team NCAA titles; he took the individual titles in slalom and the combined in 1965 at Crystal Mountain, Washington, as the Pioneers won their fifth of seven consecutive team titles.

His brother Kim, sister Suzy, and cousin Jon are also former competitive skiers.

World Cup results

Race podiums
3 podiums – (3 SL)
23 top tens – (16 SL]], 7 GS)

Season standings

Points were only awarded for top ten finishes (see scoring system).

World Championship results 

From 1948 through 1980, the Winter Olympics were also the World Championships for alpine skiing.
At the World Championships from 1954 through 1980, the combined was a "paper race" using the results of the three events (DH, GS, SL).

Olympic results

References

External links

 
 Rick Chaffee World Cup standings at the International Ski Federation
 
 University of Denver Athletics Hall of Fame – Class of 1999 – Rick Chaffee
 Union Institute & University – affiliated faculty – Rick Chaffee

1945 births
Living people
Sportspeople from Vermont
American male alpine skiers
Olympic alpine skiers of the United States
Alpine skiers at the 1968 Winter Olympics
Alpine skiers at the 1972 Winter Olympics